This is a list of residences occupied by the Japanese Imperial Family, noting the seasons of the year they are traditionally occupied.

Members of the Japanese Imperial Family inhabit a range of residences around Japan. Some are official imperial palaces; others are used as private residences, although they are all owned and maintained by the state. Other imperial palaces are no longer residences (e.g. the Akasaka Palace). Some remain in irregular use for imperial occasions. Some of the Imperial Palaces and villas enjoy legal protection such as the Akasaka Palace which is a National Treasure or the Heijō Palace, which is a Special Historic Site and listed as part of the UNESCO World Heritage Site Historic Monuments of Ancient Nara.

The occupied imperial residences are cared for and maintained by the Imperial Household Agency. Former palaces or sites are under the administration of various ministries or local authorities.

Current residences by residents

Current residences by type

Formerly privately used

Former residences by date

References